This is the complete list of Asian Games medalists in weightlifting from 1951 to 2018.

Men

Flyweight
 52 kg: 1958–1990
 54 kg: 1994

Bantamweight
 56 kg: 1951–1990
 59 kg: 1994
 56 kg: 1998–2018

Featherweight
 60 kg: 1951–1990
 64 kg: 1994
 62 kg: 1998–2018

Lightweight
 67.5 kg: 1951–1990
 70 kg: 1994
 69 kg: 1998–2018

Middleweight
 75 kg: 1951–1990
 76 kg: 1994
 77 kg: 1998–2018

Light heavyweight
 82.5 kg: 1951–1990
 83 kg: 1994
 85 kg: 1998–2018

Middle heavyweight
 90 kg: 1951–1990
 91 kg: 1994
 94 kg: 1998–2018

First heavyweight
 100 kg: 1978–1990
 99 kg: 1994

Heavyweight
 +90 kg: 1951–1966
 110 kg: 1970–1990
 108 kg: 1994
 105 kg: 1998–2018

Super heavyweight
 +110 kg: 1974–1990
 +108 kg: 1994
 +105 kg: 1998–2018

Women

Flyweight
 44 kg: 1990
 46 kg: 1994
 48 kg: 1998–2018

Bantamweight
 48 kg: 1990
 50 kg: 1994

Featherweight
 52 kg: 1990
 54 kg: 1994
 53 kg: 1998–2018

Lightweight
 56 kg: 1990
 59 kg: 1994
 58 kg: 1998–2018

Middleweight
 60 kg: 1990
 64 kg: 1994
 63 kg: 1998–2018

Light heavyweight
 67.5 kg: 1990
 70 kg: 1994
 69 kg: 1998–2018

Middle heavyweight
 75 kg: 1990
 76 kg: 1994
 75 kg: 1998–2018

Heavyweight
 82.5 kg: 1990
 83 kg: 1994

Super heavyweight
 +82.5 kg: 1990
 +83 kg: 1994
 +75 kg: 1998–2018

Men's snatch

Flyweight
 52 kg: 1974

Bantamweight
 56 kg: 1974

Featherweight
 60 kg: 1974

Lightweight
 67.5 kg: 1974

Middleweight
 75 kg: 1974

Light heavyweight
 82.5 kg: 1974

Middle heavyweight
 90 kg: 1974

Heavyweight
 110 kg: 1974

Super heavyweight
 +110 kg: 1974

Men's clean & jerk

Flyweight
 52 kg: 1974

Bantamweight
 56 kg: 1974

Featherweight
 60 kg: 1974

Lightweight
 67.5 kg: 1974

Middleweight
 75 kg: 1974

Light heavyweight
 82.5 kg: 1974

Middle heavyweight
 90 kg: 1974

Heavyweight
 110 kg: 1974

Super heavyweight
 +110 kg: 1974

References 

Medalists from previous Asian Games – Men
Medalists from previous Asian Games – Men – Discontinued
Medalists from previous Asian Games – Women
Medalists from previous Asian Games – Women – Discontinued

External links 
 Asian Weightlifting Confederation

Weightlifting
medalists